Holborow is a surname. Notable people with the surname include:

Barbara Holborow (1930–2012), Australian magistrate
Eric John Holborow (1918–2009), English physician and medical researcher
Jonathan Holborow (b. 1943), British newspaper editor
Justin Holborow (born 1996), Australian actor
Marnie Holborow, Irish writer and academic
Lady Mary Holborow (1936-2017)
Rachel Holborow, founding member of Red Monkey
Wally Holborow (1913–1986), American baseball player
William Holborow (1841–1917), Australian politician